Santonic acid is an organic compound containing both carboxylic acid and ketone functionality.

It was synthesized from santonin by base-mediated hydrolysis of a lactone followed by a multistep rearrangement process by R. B. Woodward.

Unusually for a carboxylic acid, santonic acid does not form hydrogen-bonded dimers in the crystalline phase. Rather, it adopts a polymeric structure, with individual santonic acid molecules linked by intermolecular carboxyl-to-ketone hydrogen bonds.

References

Ketones
Sesquiterpenes
Propionic acids
Tricyclic compounds